The Flash of Fate is a 1918 American silent thriller film directed by Elmer Clifton and starring Herbert Rawlinson, Sally Starr and Jack Nelson.

Cast
 Herbert Rawlinson as Randolph Shorb
 Sally Starr as Mary Freeman
 Jack Nelson as Joe Freeman
 Dana Ong as Henry Shorb
 Madge Kirby as Gertrude Shorb
 Willis Marks as Abner Hinman
 Charles West as Philadelphia Johnson
 L. Frank Baum as Dave Hinman

References

Bibliography
James Robert Parish & Michael R. Pitts. Film directors: a guide to their American films. Scarecrow Press, 1974.

External links
 

1918 films
1910s thriller films
1910s English-language films
American silent feature films
American thriller films
American black-and-white films
Universal Pictures films
Films directed by Elmer Clifton
1910s American films
Silent thriller films